San Clemente is a coastal village located in the province of Manabí, Ecuador.
The population is approximately 2,000 inhabitants, most of whom are families working in fishing or tourism.

External links
San Clemente webpage
Travel Guide to San Clemente

Populated places in Manabí Province